Carlos Augusto Morales López (born 5 April 1977) is a Mexican politician, public official and social movement leader  affiliated with Morena. Formerly, he was a member of the PRD. He served as Federal Deputy of the LXII Legislature of the Mexican Congress representing the Federal District. Currently, he serves as the Chief of the Peacebuilding Strategies Unit within the Citizen Security and Protection Ministry of the Mexican Federal Government.

Raised in Iztapalapa, a popular borough in Mexico City, he studied economics at the Universidad Nacional Autónoma de México and earned a masters degree in Constitutional Law at the same university, with a thesis focused on electoral accountability for legislators.

He was a founding member of the PRD in Mexico City, for which he served as Organization Secretary. From 2009 to 2012 he served as local deputy of the V Legislature of the Federal District Assembly. From 2012 to 2015, he was a Federal Deputy in the LXII Legislature of the Mexican Congress.

Since 2018, he has held several positions in Morena local and federal administrations. During the first year of Dr. Claudia Sheinbaum Pardo as Mexico City Mayor, he worked in the Mobility Secretariat. Afterwards, he served as Chief of Staff and Special advisor to the Office of the Mayor. Since January, 2021, he was appointed to the Citizen Security and Protection Ministry of the Mexican Federal Government by Secretary Rosa Icela Rodriguez, where he is in charge of the "Mesas de Paz" strategy.

References

1977 births
Living people
People from Mexico City
Members of the Chamber of Deputies (Mexico)
Party of the Democratic Revolution politicians
21st-century Mexican politicians

Morena (political party) politicians